Stok is a village in the Leh district of Ladakh, India. It is located in the Leh tehsil, in the Indus Valley 17 km southeast of the Leh town.

Stok's 19th century palace is the current residence of the former royal family of Ladakh. Within the palace, a museum contains the shrine, crown, ceremonial dress and jewellery of the Ladakhi king.

Stok Kangri sits at the head of the Stok Chu river valley.

Siddhartha School is located at the northernmost edge of the village.

Geography

Demographics
According to the 2011 census of India, Stok has 300 households. The effective literacy rate (i.e. the literacy rate of population excluding children aged 6 and below) is 73.79%.

See also
 Chogyal
 History of Stok
 Dogra–Tibetan War
 Zhabdrung

References

Villages in Leh tehsil